Hail to the King is the sixth studio album by American heavy metal band Avenged Sevenfold, released on August 23, 2013, through Warner Bros. Records. The album was produced by Mike Elizondo. Hail to the King is the only Avenged Sevenfold album to feature drummer Arin Ilejay, prior to his departure in July 2015. It is also the first Avenged Sevenfold album without musical contributions from Ilejay's late predecessor, Jimmy "The Rev" Sullivan; the bonus track, "St. James", was written in his memory.

The album was a commercial and critical success, reaching number one on the Billboard 200. This marks Avenged Sevenfold's second album to top the Billboard chart (after Nightmare), as well as their first to reach number one in the UK, topping the UK Albums Chart. It also topped the Canadian, Brazilian, Finnish and Irish album charts, and spawned two number one singles on Billboard's Mainstream Rock, "Hail to the King", and "Shepherd of Fire". The former spent 11 weeks on the top of the chart. On April 15, 2021, the album was certified Platinum by the RIAA for sales of over 1,000,000 copies.

Background
On November 15, 2012, vocalist M. Shadows said that the band has been working on a new album since the recording of "Carry On" in August 2012. In December, the band said that it plans to begin recording material for their next album in January 2013, with release planned for later in the year. In January 2013 the band started recording their new album. The band started streaming snippets of their new album in May 2013 on their new radio app. It was on the app that Arin Ilejay was confirmed as an official band member and replacement of deceased drummer and founding member The Rev. In an interview with Metal Hammer about the new album, M. Shadows said that the album would sound more blues rock-influenced and more like classic rock and classic metal in the vein of Black Sabbath and Led Zeppelin.

The band released four teasers on YouTube showing the band going through the recording process as well as providing snippets of songs off the album. On June 26, 2013, the band revealed the title, cover art and release date of album. In July, the band revealed the complete track list of the album.

On August 8, 2013, "Shepherd of Fire" was revealed to be the theme song of the Call of Duty: Black Ops II Zombies map "Origins", included in its final downloadable content pack titled Apocalypse.

Musical style
Synyster Gates stated of the album: "I think our songwriting has improved by leaps and bounds. Sonically, this record is our biggest record by far. When you turn this thing on, it blasts your head off." M. Shadows stated about the album's music: "On this record, we want a very bare bones, riff-oriented approach. Because it's really easy for us to say 'That melody would sound great here, throw this background vocal here, here's this harmony.' We had to restrain ourselves from doing that just to keep it more badass and just more straightforward rock."

Zacky Vengeance stated: "We styled everything back and went to the core of heavy metal instead of trying to overcomplicate it. We wrote and wrote, and felt we really achieved what we were going for (...) we're really proud of what we've come up with." Johnny Christ stated about the album's musical style in an interview with Bravewords: "It's definitely us. It's just the next progression. It's probably the heaviest record that we've put out - in its own right. It's been a great response for the single [Hail to the King] so far, which I feel is a good way to see what the rest of the record is going to sound like. There will be some surprises in there for fans, but overall, I'm just excited." He also said the album is more groove metal-oriented. The album also shows a thrash metal sound, with fast to mid-paced tempos, heavily distorted guitars and war, religious intolerance or corruption themed lyrics.

Release and promotion
On July 15, 2013, the album was made available for pre-order and the title track, "Hail to the King", was released.

The same day, the band revealed a Limited Edition of Hail to the King for pre-order available on their website, much as they did with their previous album, Nightmare. The limited edition set included:

 Limited Edition "Treasure Box": Antique gold colored embossed foil paper wrapped box featuring exclusive Hail to the King artwork
 Deluxe Hail To The King album on CD: Housed in a digi-pak with a card including a download to an extra bonus track
 Exclusive Canvas Print: 11.75″ × 11.75″ Canvas print of the Album Cover artwork, printed and rolled up to fit inside the treasure box
 Photo Book: 11.5″ × 7.125″ 20-page + cover perfect-bound soft-cover book featuring a sampling of photos of the band throughout the years
 Death Bat Challenge Coin: 2″ silver colored metal coin with a design stamped on front & back
 Death Bat Skeleton Key: 4.5″ silver colored metal skeleton key
 Digital Content: Instant download Hail to the King Single. Download of Hail to the King album on street date
 Pre-Sale access to the upcoming Avenged Sevenfold US Tour

On August 19, 2013, the album was made available for streaming on iTunes.

Critical reception

Hail to the King received positive reviews upon release. At Metacritic, which assigns a normalized rating out of 100 to reviews from mainstream music critics, the album received an average score of 70, based on 9 reviews, which indicates "generally favorable" reviews. At AnyDecentMusic?, that collates critical reviews from more than 50 media sources, the album scored 6.7 points out of 10, based on eight reviews.

In a summary of his review, Chris Epting of Loudwire called the album "a modern metal classic that reflects the past while very much embracing the present". Artistdirect's Rick Florino stated, "Hail to the King doesn't just raise the bar for the band, but it raises the bar for everyone else to follow and compete with." In a very positive review, Dom Lawson of The Guardian judged, "Stripped down to a core of thudding Sabbath-like grooves and brash, spiky vocal refrains, Avenged now sound every bit as vital and imperious as the bands they aspire to emulate." "Hail to the King represents a clean sweep, a divergence into classic metal and their best chance of hitting the heights they've always longed for", according to Q. "The next giant crossover metal band has arrived", reviewer Tom Bryant concluded, giving the album a 4 stars out of 5 rating.

Not all critics were as enthusiastic. In a mixed review, Jason Lymangrover of AllMusic remarked: "Unfortunately, once they tried to take inspiration from other bands, they mimicked them so well that they lost their sense of identity in the process". He also accused "This Means War" of ripping off Metallica's song "Sad but True". In a more negative review, Bradley Zorgdrager of Exclaim! said: "After it concludes, Hail to the King makes it challenging for listeners to recall any specific moment, which defeats the purpose of a pop (metal) album". The album also has been compared to bands like Iron Maiden, Metallica, and Pantera.

In a blog post, Machine Head frontman Robb Flynn was also very critical of the album, denouncing it as a mere "cover album" and making several jokes about the similarities a selection of songs share with those by Metallica, Megadeth, and Guns N' Roses. Flynn later revealed he was joking and was actually "happy" for their success, saying "It's time to poke a little fun at A7X." M. Shadows responded to the criticism saying that he "read it as a joke", but noted that "if it is a joke, it was kind of overboard".

Accolades

Loudwire Music Awards

|-
| 2013 || Hail to the King || Rock Album of the Year || 
|-
| 2013 || Hail to the King || Best Rock Song || 

Revolver Golden Gods Awards

|-
| 2014 || Hail to the King || Album of the Year || 
|-
| 2014 || Hail to the King || Song of the Year || 
|-
| 2014 || M. Shadows || Best Vocalist || 
|-
| 2014 || Synyster Gates & Zacky Vengeance || Best Guitarists || 
|-
| 2014 || Arin Ilejay || Best Drummer || 
|-
| 2014 || Johnny Christ || Best Bassist ||

Commercial performance
Hail to the King debuted at number one on the UK Albums Chart on September 1, 2013. It also debuted at number two on the Official Finnish Albums Chart and at number five in Germany.

The album sold 159,000 copies in the United States in its first week of release to debut at number one on the Billboard 200 chart.

Track listing
All songs written and composed by M. Shadows, Zacky Vengeance, Synyster Gates, and Johnny Christ.

Personnel
Avenged Sevenfold
 M. Shadows – lead vocals
 Zacky Vengeance – rhythm guitar, backing vocals
 Synyster Gates – lead guitar, backing vocals, additional vocals on "Planets", co-lead vocals on "Doing Time"
 Johnny Christ – bass guitar, backing vocals
 Arin Ilejay – drums, percussion

Session musicians

 Storm Lee Gardner – choir vocals on "Requiem"
 Ran Jackson – choir vocals on "Requiem"
 Jessi Collins – choir vocals on "Requiem"
 Sharlotte Gibson – choir vocals on "Requiem"
 Rick D. Waserman – voice-over on "Requiem"
 Brent Arrowood – sound effects on "Shepherd of Fire"  
 Brian Haner Sr – outro guitar solo on "Coming Home"
 David Campbell – orchestral arrangement & conductor
 Suzie Katayama - cello on "Shepherd of Fire", "Requiem", "Crimson Day", "Planets" and "Acid Rain"
 Dane Little, John E. Acosta – cello on "Requiem", "Crimson Day" and "Acid Rain"
 Charlie Bisharat, John Wittenberg, Josefina Vergara, Michelle Richards, Natalie Leggett, Sara Parkins, Songa Lee, Tereza Stanislav – violin on "Requiem", "Crimson Day" and "Acid Rain"
 Ed Meares - upright bass on "Shepherd of Fire", "Requiem" and "Planets"
 John Fumo, Rick Baptist – trumpet on "Shepherd of Fire", "Requiem" and "Planets"
 Jeff Babko – piano on "Acid Rain"
 Alan Kaplan – trombone on "Shepherd of Fire", "Requiem" and "Planets"
 Steven Holtman, Andrew Martin, Jaime Ochoa - bass trombone on "Shepherd of Fire", "Requiem" and "Planets"
 Douglas Tornquist – tuba on "Shepherd of Fire", "Requiem" and "Planets"
 Joe Meyer, John Reynolds – horn on "Shepherd of Fire", "Requiem" and "Planets"

Production
 Mike Elizondo – production, keyboards on "Crimson Day", "Heretic" and "Coming Home", sound effects on "Shepherd of Fire" and "Acid Rain"
 Allen Wolfe – A&R
 Joanna Terrasi – A&R
 Brent Arrowood – assistant engineer
 Chris Sporleder – assistant engineer
 D.A. Frizell – illustrations, treatment
 Adam Hawkins – engineer
 Paul Suarez – pro-tools
 Cam Rackman – paintings, portraits
 Andy Wallace – mixer
 Bob Ludwig – mastering engineer

Charts and certifications

Weekly charts

Year-end charts

Certifications

Release history

References

2013 albums
Avenged Sevenfold albums
Warner Records albums
Albums produced by Mike Elizondo
Albums recorded at Capitol Studios